Wilhelm Moritz may refer to:

, Prussian general
Wilhelm Moritz (Luftwaffe officer), German officer during World War II